Symphylus is a genus of shield-backed bugs in the family Scutelleridae. There are at least four described species in Symphylus.

Species
These four species belong to the genus Symphylus:
 Symphylus caribbeanus Kirkaldy, 1909
 Symphylus cyphonoides (Walker, 1867)
 Symphylus deplanatus (Herrich-Schäffer, 1837)
 Symphylus obtusus Dallas, 1851

References

Further reading

External links

Scutelleridae
Articles created by Qbugbot
Pentatomomorpha genera